Repyovsky District  is an administrative and municipal district (raion), one of the thirty-two in Voronezh Oblast, Russia. It is located in the northwest of the oblast. Its administrative center is the rural locality (a selo) of Repyovka. Population:  The population of Repyovka accounts for 35.3% of the district's total population.

References

Notes

Sources

Districts of Voronezh Oblast